Marie-France Vignéras (born 1946) is a French mathematician. She is a Professor Emeritus of the Institut de Mathématiques de Jussieu in Paris. She is known for her proof published in 1980 of the existence of isospectral non-isometric Riemann surfaces. Such surfaces show that one cannot hear the shape of a hyperbolic drum. Another highlight of her work is the establishment of the mod-l local Langlands correspondence for GL(n) in 2000. Her current work concerns the p-adic Langlands program.

Early life and education
Born in 1946, Vignéras was the daughter of Janine Mocudé and Robert Vignéras (sea captain and pilot in the port of Dakar). She spent her childhood in Senegal, and did her high school studies at the lycée Van-Vollenhoven in Dakar. She moved to the University of Bordeaux after receiving her baccalauréat in Senegal. She received the agrégation de mathématiques in 1969 and the doctorat d'Etat in 1974; her thesis was written under the direction of Jacques Martinet.

Career
Vignéras served as Director of Mathematics at the Ecole Normale Supérieure de Sèvres from 1977 to 1983. At the conclusion of her term at the ENS, she rejoined her colleagues at the University of Paris 7. Since 2010 she has been Emeritus Professor. Vignéras has made numerous invited visits to foreign universities and institutes, including the Max Planck Institute for Mathematics in Bonn, the University of California at Berkeley, the Tata Institute for Fundamental Research in Mumbai, the Radcliffe Institute at Harvard University. She has been the Emmy Noether Professor at the University of Göttingen and has been an invited speaker at the European Congress of Mathematics (Barcelona, 2000) and the International Congress of Mathematics (Beijing, 2002).

Her thesis students include Jean-Loup Waldspurger (directeur de recherches at the C.N.R.S.), Jean-Francois Dat (professor at l'Université Pierre et Marie Curie (Paris 6)), Rachel Ollivier (associate professor at the University of British Columbia) and Tony Ly.

Awards
She became a member of the Academia Europaea in 2017. She was elected to the 2018 class of Fellows of the American Mathematical Society.

Selected publications

References

External links

1946 births
Living people
20th-century French mathematicians
21st-century French mathematicians
University of Bordeaux alumni
French women mathematicians
Fellows of the American Mathematical Society
Members of Academia Europaea
20th-century women mathematicians
21st-century women mathematicians
20th-century French women
21st-century French women